A leaf is an organ of a vascular plant.

Leaf or Leaves may also refer to:

Places
Leaf, Georgia, United States, an unincorporated community
Leaf, Mississippi, United States, an unincorporated community
Leaf River (disambiguation), several rivers in North America

People
Leaf (surname), a list of people with the family name Leaf or Leafe
Leaf Daniell (1877–1913), British fencer, silver medalist in the 1908 Olympics
Leaf Huang, Taiwanese-born American biophysicist
Pine Leaf, possibly the same person as Woman Chief, a female chief of the Crow tribe

Arts, entertainment, and media
Leaf (Dutch band), a pop band formed in 2005
Leaves (Icelandic band), a five-piece alternative rock band formed in 2001
The Leaves, a 1960s American garage band
A Leaf, a classical piece written by Paul McCartney, with assistance from John Fraser
The Leaf Label, an independent record label based in Leeds, United Kingdom
"Leaves", a children's story from The Railway Series book Gordon the Big Engine by the Reverend Wilbert Awdry
Leaves, a devotional magazine published by the Missionary Order of Mariannhill in the United States

Brands and enterprises
Leaf (Israeli company), a photography company
Leaf (Japanese company), a visual novel studio
Leaf (payment platform)
Leading Edge Air Foils, also called "LEAF", an American aircraft parts supplier
Leaf Books, a small Wales-based publisher
Leaf Brands, an American candy company
Leaf International, a Dutch-Swedish confectionery company
Nissan Leaf, an electric car

Material
Leaf (books), a single sheet of paper
Metal leaf, a thin metal foil, e.g.:
Gold leaf

Science, engineering and technology
Leaf, in foliation mathematics
Large European Acoustic Facility, a sound facility operated by the European Space Agency
Law Enforcement Access Field, as used in the Clipper chip encryption device
Leaf node, part of a tree data structure in computer science
Leaf object, an object represented by an end node in a tree structure
LEAF Project, a collection of Linux distributions dedicated to routing
Leaf spring, a common type of vehicle suspension
The Leaf (AI) Project, a group robot development program involved with artificial intelligence

Other uses
Lake Eden Arts Festival, a festival in Black Mountain, North Carolina 
Leaf-class tanker, a class of support tanker of the British Royal Fleet Auxiliary
Women's Legal Education and Action Fund, a Canadian women's legal advocacy group
Life Extension Advocacy Foundation, a non-profit organization supporting anti-aging research
Canada
Canadians

See also
Leef (disambiguation)
Leif (disambiguation)
Leefe Robinson (1895-1918), British First World War pilot awarded the Victoria Cross
Leaf by Niggle, a short story by J. R. R. Tolkien